The men's doubles at the 2007 Hamburg Masters was won by Bob and Mike Bryan, who defeated Paul Hanley and Kevin Ullyett in the final.

Seeds
All seeds receive a bye into the second round.

  Bob Bryan /  Mike Bryan (champions)
  Jonas Björkman /  Max Mirnyi (quarterfinals)
  Martin Damm /  Nenad Zimonjić (second round)
  Mark Knowles /  Daniel Nestor (second round)
  Paul Hanley /  Kevin Ullyett (finals)
  Jonathan Erlich /  Andy Ram (semifinals)
  Pavel Vízner /  Todd Perry (second round)
  Simon Aspelin /  Julian Knowle (semifinals)

Draw

Finals

Section 1

Section 2

External links 
Association of Tennis Professionals (ATP) draw

Men's Doubles